Eusebio Vittorio Giovanni Battista Capellaro (1877–1943) was a Brazilian film director, film producer,  film actor, and screenwriter who worked in the Cinema of Brazil between 1915 and 1935.

Director filmography
 Inocência (1915)
 O Guaraní (1916)
 Iracema (1917)
 O Cruzeiro do Sul (1917)
 O Garimpeiro (1920)
 O Guaraní (1926)
 O Caçador de Diamantes (1934)
 Fazendo Fitas (1935)

External links 

1877 births
1943 deaths
Brazilian film directors
Brazilian film producers
Brazilian male film actors
Brazilian screenwriters
Italian film directors
Italian film producers
Italian male film actors
20th-century Italian screenwriters
People from Mongrando
Brazilian people of Italian descent
20th-century Italian male actors
Italian male screenwriters
20th-century Italian male writers